Feliciano López and Marc López defeated Bob and Mike Bryan in the final, 6–4, 6–7(6–8), 6–3 to win the men's doubles tennis title at the 2016 French Open.

Ivan Dodig and Marcelo Melo were the defending champions, but lost in the semifinals to López and López.

Seeds

Draw

Finals

Top half

Section 1

Section 2

Bottom half

Section 3

Section 4

References

External links
 Doubles Draw
2016 French Open – Men's draws and results at the International Tennis Federation

Men's Doubles
French Open by year – Men's doubles
French Open - Men's Doubles